Sosnovy Bor is a rural locality (a selo) in Krasnoselskoye Rural Settlement, Yuryev-Polsky District, Vladimir Oblast, Russia. The population was 560 as of 2010. There are 7 streets.

Geography 
Sosnovy Bor is located 8 km south of Yuryev-Polsky (the district's administrative centre) by road. Kolokoltsevo is the nearest rural locality.

References 

Rural localities in Yuryev-Polsky District